The Soft Boys were an English rock band led by Robyn Hitchcock primarily during the 1970s, whose initially old-fashioned music style of psychedelic/folk-rock became part of the neo-psychedelia scene with the release of  Underwater Moonlight.

The band formed in 1976 in Cambridge, England as Dennis and the Experts comprising Robyn Hitchcock (guitar), Rob Lamb (half-brother of radio host and author Charlie Gillett) guitar, Andy Metcalfe (bass), and Morris Windsor (drums). Alan Davies replaced Lamb after only four gigs late in 1976, and Kimberley Rew eventually replaced Davies. Matthew Seligman replaced Metcalfe in 1979.

The band broke up in 1981 after Underwater Moonlight. Rew formed the more mainstream pop group Katrina and the Waves, while Hitchcock went on to a prolific career with a similar whimsical, surrealistic style, forming Robyn Hitchcock and the Egyptians in 1984 with fellow Soft Boys Morris Windsor and Andy Metcalfe, who went on to tour and record for ten years. They were briefly joined by Rew and Seligman in a re-formed Soft Boys for a UK tour in 1994 to mark the release of a box set of their work, and then reformed again in 2001 without Metcalfe for the 20th anniversary of Underwater Moonlight and the release of a new album, Nextdoorland, in 2002.  They disbanded once again in 2003.

Seligman died in 2020 of complications from COVID-19.

Discography

Albums
A Can of Bees (1979)
Underwater Moonlight (1980)
Nextdoorland (2002)

Compilation and live albums
Two Halves for the Price of One (1981) (Studio rarities and live tracks)
Live at the Portland Arms (cassette, 1983; LP, 1988)
Invisible Hits (1983)
Wading Through a Ventilator (EP) (1984) (Contains Give It To The Soft Boys EP, plus extra tracks)
Raw Cuts (EP) (1989) (A retitled version of Wading Through a Ventilator)
1976-81 (2 CD) (1993) (Best-of, plus rarities, out-takes and live tracks)
Where Are The Prawns (cassette, 1994)
Underwater Moonlight... And How It Got There (2 CD) (2001) (Contains all of Underwater Moonlight, plus an additional disc of demos, rehearsals, and out-takes)

Singles and EPs
Give It To The Soft Boys 7" EP: "Wading Through a Ventilator" b/w "The Face of Death" and "Hear My Brane" (1977)
"(I Want to Be An) Anglepoise Lamp" b/w "Fatman's Son" (1978)
Near the Soft Boys 7" EP: "Kingdom of Love" b/w "Vegetable Man" & "Strange" (1980)
"I Wanna Destroy You" b/w "Old Pervert" (1980)
"Only the Stones Remain" b/w "The Asking Tree" (1981)
"Love Poisoning" (1982)
"He's a Reptile" b/w "Song No. 4" (1983)
"The Face of Death" b/w "The Yodelling Hoover" (1989)
Side Three (CD EP) (2002)

An album financed by Radar Records was recorded at Rockfield Studios in 1978, at the same time Rush was recording Hemispheres there. The resultant album was never released, although one or two of the tracks have had subsequent release as part of compilations.

References

External links
The Asking Tree, database of Soft Boys and Robyn Hitchcock live appearances and releases
The Glass Hotel
The Soft Boys collection at the Internet Archive's live music archive

English post-punk music groups
English new wave musical groups
Musical groups established in 1976
Musical groups disestablished in 1980
Musical groups reestablished in 2001
Musical groups from Cambridge
English alternative rock groups
Neo-psychedelia groups
Attic Records (Canada) artists
Radar Records artists
Rykodisc artists
Matador Records artists